This is the Battle of Pingxingguan order of battle during the Second Sino-Japanese War.

China
Chinese units mentioned defending Pingxingguan: [1]
 17th Corps - Kao Kuei-tse (from 7th Army Group)
 84st Division - Kao Kuei-tse (concurrent)
 21st Division - Li Hsien-chou
 73rd Division - Liu Feng-pin (from 33rd Army)
15th Corps  - Liu Mao-en (from 13th Army)
 64th  Division - Wu Ting-lin
 65th  Division - Liu Mao-en (concurrent)
 115th Division – Lin Biao, deputy  Nie Rongzhen (from 18th Army Group – 8th Route Army) 
 343th Brigade - Zhou Jianping
 685th Regiment – Yang Dezhi
 686th Regiment - Li Tienyou
 344th Brigade - Xu Haidong
 687th Regiment - Zhang Shaodong 
 688th Regiment – ? (in reserve)
 7th Group, (light bombers/scout-attack reconnaissance), O2U Corsair Scouting-Attack planes, O-2M Reconnaissance-Attack planes

Japan
Attacking Pingxingguan:
21st Brigade, 5th Japanese Division

Japanese forces in the ambush battle of Pingxingguan:
 3rd Battalion, 21st Regiment, 21st Brigade, 5th Japanese Division
 Supply troops of the 21st Regiment - Lieutenant 高桥义夫
 15 supply troops and 70 escorts in 70 horse-drawn vehicles with 50 horses, filled with clothes, food, ammunition and proceeded westwards towards Pingxingguan. 
 Japanese 6th Depot
 2nd Company motorized supply column - First Lieutenant 矢岛俊彦
 176 men in 50 trucks 
 3rd Company motorized supply column - Major 中西次八
 ? men in 30 trucks

Sources
[1] Hsu Long-hsuen and Chang Ming-kai, History of The Sino-Japanese War (1937-1945) 2nd Ed., 1971. Translated by Wen Ha-hsiung, Chung Wu Publishing; 33, 140th Lane, Tung-hwa Street, Taipei, Taiwan Republic of China.
 Description (in Chinese) of the Battle of Pingxingguan in the on line version of the book: 中国抗日战争正面战场作战记 (China's Anti-Japanese War Combat Operations) by 郭汝瑰 (Guo Rugui), Jiangsu People's Publishing House, 2005-7-1,  
  华北作战平型关大捷 1(North China Battles, the Pingxingguan victory 1)
  华北作战平型关大捷 2(North China Battles, the Pingxingguan victory 2)
 a more recent study (in Chinese)  关于平型关战斗的史实重建问题  "On the reconstruction of the facts of the Battle of Pingxingguan" by Professor Yang Kui Song
 A partial translation of Prof. Yang Kui Songon's article on Axis History Forum: The Battle of Pingxinguan 1937
  Pingxingguan Campaign

Second Sino-Japanese War orders of battle
Battles of the Second Sino-Japanese War
旧日军档案中的平型关大捷